Trichobalya is a genus of skeletonizing leaf beetles in the family Chrysomelidae. There are at least three described species in Trichobalya. They are found in Indomalaya and the Palaearctic.

Species
These three species, and possibly more, belong to the genus Trichobalya:
 Trichobalya bowringii (Baly,1890)
 Trichobalya tiomenensis Mohamedsaid, 1999
 Trichobalya ventrituberculata Romantsov, 2020.

References

External links

 

Galerucinae
Chrysomelidae genera
Taxa named by Julius Weise